Sandro Martins Perpétuo Júnior (born 29 June 2001), known as Sandro Perpétuo or simply Sandro, is a Brazilian footballer who plays for Villa Nova, on loan from Atlético Mineiro. Mainly a right back, he can also play as a defensive midfielder.

Club career

Santos
Sandro was born in Governador Valadares, Minas Gerais, and joined Santos' youth setup at the age of 11. On 27 November 2017, he signed his first professional contract with the club.

On 12 September 2019, Sandro was loaned to Ponte Preta until the end of the 2020 Copa São Paulo de Futebol Júnior. He returned to his parent club in February 2020.

Sandro made his professional debut on 28 February 2021, starting in a 2–2 Campeonato Paulista away draw against Santo André. He played four more matches for the side before returning to the under-20s, and rescinded his contract with the club on 15 March 2022.

Atlético Mineiro
On 16 March 2022, Sandro agreed to a deal with Atlético Mineiro.

International career
On 14 October 2016, Sandro was called up to Brazil under-16s for a week of trainings.

Career statistics

References

External links

2001 births
Living people
People from Governador Valadares
Sportspeople from Minas Gerais
Brazilian footballers
Association football defenders
Association football midfielders
Campeonato Brasileiro Série D players
Santos FC players
Clube Atlético Mineiro players
Oeste Futebol Clube players
Villa Nova Atlético Clube players